Radford College is an independent school, Anglican, coeducational day school, located in Bruce, Australian Capital Territory, Australia.

Founded in 1847, the college is named after Bishop Lewis Bostock Radford. It has a selective enrolment policy, with nearly an equal balance of boys and girls, and currently caters for over 18,000 students from pre-kindergarten to Year 12.

History
Radford was established on 11 February 1984, its foundation stone having been laid on 30 April 1983. Under founding principal Jock Mackinnon AM, the College opened with 240 students and 21 staff. Professor T.B. Millar AO served as the inaugural chairman. Radford presently has more than 1,600 students enrolled across its Junior (Years pre-kindergarten to 6), secondary School (Years 7–12).

Principals

Curriculum 
Junior School pupils undertake the International Baccalaureate Primary Years programme.

The Secondary School operates a core curriculum of English, Mathematics, Science, History, Geography, Religious and Values Education, and Physical education as well as various electives including Performing Arts, Creative Arts, Design and Technology, and Languages. A strong emphasis is placed upon service learning, and active participation in cocurricular activities.

In the Senior School, students work toward the Year 12 Certificate, a credential awarded to ACT secondary students on completion of their studies. Radford College offers a range of courses leading to an Australian Tertiary Admission Rank (ATAR), in addition to accredited courses for students not seeking to enter university. In 2011, more Radford students sought tertiary entrance than any other school in Canberra, with 93% of students receiving an ATAR. Radford College has a record of academic success, with its Year 12 graduates achieving the highest median ATAR of all ACT schools in 2004, 2005, 2006, 2007, 2008, 2010, 2011, 2012, 2014, 2015 and 2016.

Connections with other schools 
Radford College is an active member in Round Square, with exchanges and participation in conferences and service opportunities.

Radford College is twinned with the following schools:
 Konko Gakuen school in Okayama prefecture, Japan
 Kure National College of Technology, in Hiroshima, Japan 
 BISU High School in Chaoyang District, Beijing, China

Collegians and notable alumni
The Radford Collegians' Association is about building a community that provides ongoing support to its members on a social, educational and career level. Originally founded in 1989, the association has grown by about 160 members per year. With over 6,500 former students, the Association seeks to connect Collegians' to each other and their school. The association is committed to three core pillars of focus including social & community awareness, business & career opportunities and giving back. These pillars guide the Radford Collegians' in success and growth. The Association organises reunions, mentoring programs, supports college functions and funds select community outreach programs.

 Prince Viliami of Tonga, The Prince Ata, younger son of King Tupou VI
 Alistair Coe MLA – Former leader of the Opposition at the Australian Capital Territory Legislative Assembly
 Nicholas Bishop – Australian actor
 Katherine Calder – Professional Skier and Winter Olympian
 Ryan Carters – First class cricketer for New South Wales and Victoria
 Samuel Beever – Australian Diplomat - currently the Australian High Commissioner to Cyprus
 Jessica Cottis – Artistic Director and Chief Conductor of the Canberra Symphony Orchestra
 David Dawson – First class cricketer, former player for the Tasmanian Tigers and NSW
 Stef Dawson – Australian actress, known for playing Annie Cresta in the Hunger Games film franchise
 Rachel Moseley – Australian Diplomat - DFAT Assistant Secretary, Latin America and Eastern Europe Branch - former Deputy Australian High Commissioner to Papua New Guinea
 Anna Flanagan – Professional hockey player for the Hockeyroos
 Chloe Hosking – Professional racing cyclist, competing in UCI championship
Elanor Huntington, Dean of Engineering at the Australian National University
 Nick Kyrgios – Professional tennis player
Luke Letcher - Olympic bronze medalist, Australian men's quadruple scull
 Sam Michael – Formula One engineer, former director at McLaren F1 and Williams F1.
 Kaz Patafta – Professional soccer player for Lanexang United F.C.
 Tom Rogic – Socceroo, Futsalroo, Nike 'The Chance' Winner, and professional soccer player for Celtic in the Scottish Premier League.
 Allan Sly – Probability theorist, professor of mathematics at Princeton University, 2018 MacArthur Fellow
Jesse Wagstaff – Professional basketball player for the Perth Wildcats

See also
 List of schools in the Australian Capital Territory
 Associated Southern Colleges

References

External links

1984 establishments in Australia
Educational institutions established in 1984
Anglican schools in the Australian Capital Territory
High schools in the Australian Capital Territory
Round Square schools